Cullen Township is an inactive township in Pulaski County, in the U.S. state of Missouri.

Cullen Township was erected in 1833, taking its name from the local Cullen family.

References

Townships in Missouri
Townships in Pulaski County, Missouri